The Downeast Scenic Railroad (reporting mark DSRX) is a heritage railway in Ellsworth, Maine which is owned and operated by the Downeast Rail Heritage Trust, which is a 501(c)3 charitable organization founded in the fall of 2005. The railroad operates over the historic Calais Branch which was once part of the Maine Central Railroad.  Operations are out of Washington Junction and runs west towards Brewer.  The railroad inaugural run was Saturday, July 24, 2010, with invited guests on board.  The first  to Ellsworth Falls have been completed, but work continues on the line west of Ellsworth Falls from Ellsworth to Green Lake where the railroad plans to run excursion trains in the near future.

Locomotive roster

References

External links 
 

Heritage railroads in Maine
Passenger rail transportation in Maine
Railway companies established in 2005
Transportation in Hancock County, Maine
Tourist attractions in Hancock County, Maine
Ellsworth, Maine